Bhairava Ashtami, also known as Bhairavashtami, Bhairava Jayanti, Kala-Bhairava Ashtami and Kala-Bhairava Jayanti is a Hindu holy day commemorating the birthday of Bhairava (lit. "terror-inspiring"), a fearsome and wrathful manifestation of the god Shiva.
It falls on the eighth lunar day (ashtami) in the fortnight of the waning moon (Krishna paksha) in the Hindu month of Kartik (per the South Indian Amavasyant calendar, every month ends with a new moon) or Margashirsha (per the North Indian Purnimant calendar, every month ends with a full moon). By both schemes, Bhairava Ashtami falls on the same day in November–December-January.
The name Kalashtami is sometimes used to refer to this day, but might also refer to any ashtami in Krishna paksha, all of which are sacred days of Bhairava, who is also called also Dandapani (as holds a rod or Danda to punish sinners) and he rides a dog he is also known as Swaswa meaning "whose horse is a dog".

Legend
Bhairava is an manifestation of Shiva's wrath. According to the legend narrated on the occasion, the Trimurti gods, Brahma, Vishnu and Shiva were talking in a serious mood as to who was superior of them all. In the heated debate, Shiva felt slighted by remarks made by Brahma and instructed his ganor Bhairava to cut off one of Brahma's five heads. Bhairava followed Shiva's orders and one head of Brahma was cut off and thus he became four headed. Instilled with fear, all others prayed to Shiva and Bhairava.

Another slightly modified version is that when Brahma insulted Shiva, Bhairava (Kala-Bhairava) appeared from the angry Shiva's forehead and severed Brahma's head, leaving him with only four heads. The head of Brahma stuck to Bhairava's left palm due to the sin of killing Brahma, the most learned Brahmin – Brahmahatya or Brahminicide. To expiate the sin of brahmahatya, Bhairava had to perform the vow of a Kapali: wandering the world as a Bhikshatana with the skull of the slain as his begging bowl. Bhairava's sin is finally expiated when he reaches the holy city of Varanasi, where a temple dedicated to him still exists.

Practices
An all-night vigil is observed on Bhairava Ashtami with prayers, worship and tales of Bhairava, Shiva and Parvati being told. In the midnight, an arati of Bhairava should be performed with conches, bells and drums. After taking a bath in the morning, devotees, especially Shiva-worshipping Shaivas offer libations and oblations to their dead ancestors. Then, Bhairava, Shiva, Shiva's consort Parvati and Bhairava's vahana (animal vehicle), the dog, is worshipped with flowers and sweets. Dogs are also offered milk, sweets, curds and other food as offerings.

The day is considered holier if Bhairava Ashtami falls on a Sunday or a Tuesday, sacred weekdays dedicated to Bhairava. Bhairava is specifically worshipped for success, wealth, health and obstacle removal. A devotee is said to be freed of sin and the fear of death by observing Bhairava Ashtami.

Bhairava Ashtami is observed in Bhairav Prasad Temple in Vaishno Devi hills in Kashmir. On this day, an image of Kala-Bhairava is made in gold or silver and immersed in a brass metal pot filled with water and worshipped with all scriptural prayers, as is done to Shiva. Then, the priests who do the puja are offered gifts.

In Varanasi, an eight-day pilgrimage of the eight temples dedicated to Ashta Bhairava, eight subsidiary aspects of Bhairava, is undertaken on the first eight days of the fortnight, culminating with Bhairava Ashtami. On Bhairava Ashtami, Kala Bhairava, the city's guardian deity, is worshipped in his temple. For the rest of a year, a cloth covers the central icon, except his face, however on this day, the cloth is removed to reveal the whole image. The image is adorned with a garland of silver skulls on this day. Several devotees flood the temple to capture the unique opportunity to view the whole image.

References

Festivals in Nepal
Hindu holy days
November observances
December observances

Hindu festivals